Ashtead Park is a   Local Nature Reserve in Ashtead in Surrey. It is owned by Mole Valley District Council. It contains several important listed buildings. The Park itself has remains of a Roman building, four lakes/ponds and the school's playing fields and is Grade II listed on the Register of Historic Parks and Gardens.

History

Ashtead Park House

Henry Howard, 7th Duke of Norfolk sold Ashtead Manor to Sir Robert Howard (son of Thomas Howard, 1st Earl of Berkshire) in 1680. The house remained in the Howard family until it passed, through marriage, to Richard Bagot in 1783. Richard Bagot commissioned the leading architect Sir Thomas Wyatt to develop its grand façade from designs by Joseph Bonomi. Bagot then changed his name to Howard and the house remained in the Howard / Bagot family for nearly a century. The house was bought by Sir Thomas Lucas, 1st Baronet in 1880 and enlarged and altered at major expense. Lucas sold it to Pantia Ralli in 1889. Following Ralli's death the house was acquired by the City of London Corporation in 1924 and since then has been occupied by the City of London Freemen's School. The house is listed as Grade II.

Ashstead House
Ashtead House is a large red brick house with a nucleus dating back to the 17th century or earlier with 18th century and late 19th century additions.

Headmasters House
Headmasters House is an architecturally imposing red brick development which also forms part of the school campus.

Ecology
The nature reserve was formerly part of the park of Ashtead House. It is mainly woodland on heavy London Clay and it has two ponds. Fauna include the broad-bodied chaser and emperor dragonfly and the common blue damselfly.

References

Local Nature Reserves in Surrey
Country houses in Surrey
Grade II listed parks and gardens in Surrey